Larche is a former railway station in Larche, Nouvelle-Aquitaine, France. The station is located on the Coutras - Tulle railway line. Train services were suspended in 2020.

References

Defunct railway stations in Corrèze